Syed Muhammad Saqlain Shah Bukhari (born 1 January 1981) is a Pakistani politician who had been a member of the National Assembly of Pakistan, from June 2013 to May 2018.

Early life
He was born on 1 January 1981.

Political career

He ran for the seat of the National Assembly of Pakistan as a candidate of Pakistan Muslim League (N) (PML-N) from Constituency NA-182 (Layyah-II) in 2002 Pakistani general election but was unsuccessful. He received 32,247 votes and lost the seat to Malik Niaz Ahmad Jakhar, a candidate of Pakistan Peoples Party (PPP).

He was elected to the National Assembly as a candidate of PML-N from Constituency NA-182 (Layyah-II) in 2008 Pakistani general election. He received 75,910 votes and defeated Malik Niaz Ahmad Jakhar, a candidate of Pakistan Muslim League (Q) (PML-Q).

He was re-elected to the National Assembly as a candidate of PML-N from Constituency NA-182 (Layyah-II) in 2013 Pakistani general election. He received 85,292 votes and defeated Malik Niaz Ahmad, a candidate of PPP. During his tenure as Member of the National Assembly, he served as Federal Parliamentary Secretary for Planning and Development and Inter Provincial Coordination.

References

Living people
Pakistan Muslim League (N) politicians
Punjabi people
Pakistani MNAs 2013–2018
1981 births
Pakistani MNAs 2008–2013